Arthur Lloyd may refer to:

 Arthur Lloyd (rugby league), rugby league footballer of the 1930s for Wales, and York
 Arthur Lloyd (musician) (1839–1904), Scottish singer, songwriter, comedian and stage producer
 Arthur Lloyd (bishop) (1844–1907), Anglican bishop
 Arthur Lloyd (missionary) (1852–1911), Anglican missionary to Japan, academic, biographer and translator
 Arthur Selden Lloyd (1857–1936), Episcopal bishop
 Arthur Lloyd (English footballer) (1881–1945), English footballer (Wolverhampton Wanderers, Brighton & Hove Albion)
 Arthur Lloyd (Welsh footballer) (1868–1942), Welsh international footballer
 Art Lloyd (1896–1954), American cameraman
 Arthur Lloyd (historian) (1917–2009), English historian of the New Forest region of Hampshire, England

See also
 Archie Kirkman Loyd (1847–1922), MP for Abingdon
 Arthur Loyd (1882–1944), his nephew, Conservative Party politician in England